Lakshmi is a 2006 Indian Telugu-language action drama film produced by Nallamalupu Bujji on Sri Lakshmi Narasimha Productions on banner, directed by V. V. Vinayak and cinematography by Chota K. Naidu. Starring Venkatesh, Nayantara and Charmme Kaur.  The music of the movie was composed by Ramana Gogula. The film was successful at the box office and also marked Nayantara's Telugu debut.

The film was remade in Bengali in 2007 named  Sangharsha  directed by Sujit Guha starring Prosenjit , Rajatava Dutta, Swastika Mukherjee, Sayantani and in Bengali Bangladesh in 2008 named Pita Matar Amanot .

Plot
Lakshmi Narayana, the MD of Lakshmi Group of Companies, is an elder son in a family with two brothers and two sisters. He is very strict about disciplining his brothers so that they become the men that their father wanted them to be, to the point of beating them for coming home drunk. He owns a factory that is worth hundreds of crores. Shailaja a.k.a. Shailu, an employee in Lakshmi's company, has a huge crush on him. Janardhan, a former employee of Lakshmi Industries who was accused of forgery, plans to take revenge on Lakshmi by creating divisions in his family. Soon, Lakshmi's sister falls in love with a man, and he is accepted by Lakshmi, with the marriage concluding grandly. It is later revealed that the man is Janardhan's nephew. This leads to Lakshmi revealing to his siblings that he and his sister (the youngest of the five) were adopted by their parents at a young age as they were orphans who were being ill-treated by their uncles and aunts. All this leads to the splitting of the siblings with Lakshmi and his sister being thrown out of the house by their younger brothers. The people standing beside Lakshmi are all the people in his factory and his other sister. Lakshmi even ends up working in his factory for all this. He even moves into a small house with his sister, where he is later joined by his mother. Later, it is revealed that Lakshmi had fallen in love with a girl named Nandini earlier, who was the niece of his foster father. Nandini was threatened by a young man who was the son of a Kolkata-based don named Rayudu. Lakshmi beats up the guy and sends him into a coma, which earns him Rayudu's wrath. The rest of the story is about how Lakshmi stands up to all these people together.

Cast 

 Venkatesh as Lakshmi Narayana 
 Master Teja as Young Lakshmi
 Nayantara as Nandini
 Charmme Kaur as Shailaja "Shailu"
 Pradeep Rawat as Rayudu
 Sayaji Shinde as Janardhana Rao
 Brahmanandam as Sattar(Guest role)
 Sunil as Suresh
 Jayabharathi as Lakshmi's mother
 Ranganath as Lakshmi's father
 Uma as Lakshmi's sister
 Sharwanand as Lakshmi's brother
 Rajiv Kanakala as Lakshmi's brother
 Sameer as Lakshmi's brother-in-law
 Sudha as Nandini's mother
 Telangana Shakuntala as Shakuntala
 Venu Madhav as Tiger Satti
 Ahuti Prasad as doctor 
 Chalapathi Rao
 Jenny 
 L. B. Sriram as Shivayya
 Naramalli Sivaprasad
 Chatrapathi Sekhar as Bujji
 Satya Prakash as Charminar Babji
 Fish Venkat as Babji's henchman
 Rajendran as Babji's henchman
 Raghu 
 Rajitha

Production 
Jyothika was signed as the lead heroine, but was refused the offers due to her marriage preparations. She was later replaced by Nayanthara.

Soundtrack

Music composed by Ramana Gogula. Music released on ADITYA Music Company.

Reception

Critical reception
Indiaglitz gave the film 2 out of 5 stars and said "V V Vinayak's direction is on safe lines. He keeps to the linear path, without taking any chances. He knows whom he is catering to and delivers what he promised". Jeevi of idlebrain.com gave the film 3 out of 5 stars and said "First half of the film is OK and the scenes before interval are good. The second half divulges into a entirely different flashback episode. There are certain good moments in the film and has got orientation towards masses and family crowds. However, the VV Vinayak could not blend in Venkatesh’s family image and Vinayak’s mass taking in a smooth way. The biggest advantage of this film is that Lakshmi is the only mass film for the entire season of Sankranthi which gives good market penetration in C and D centers as well in the first week itself". In the 50 days of function at Eluru, the hero Venkatesh said"The success of Lakshmi film encouraged me a lot. The success of the film go to the entire unit of Lakshmi. I am happy to have delivered many hits in my career spanning 20 years from Kaliyuga Pandavulu to Lakshmi. People started calling me Lakshmi Bava after the release of this film."

Box office
The film was released in 316 screens, including 284 from then Andhra Pradesh. The film collected Rs.8 crores in its opening week. Lakshmi collected around  according to Sify. It had a 50-day run in 215 centres. The film was dubbed in Tamil under the same title. The film had a 100-day run in 94 centres.

Awards
Venu Madhav won Nandi Award for Best Male Comedian for his role in this film.

References

External links 
 

2006 films
2000s Telugu-language films
Indian action drama films
2000s masala films
Films directed by V. V. Vinayak
Films shot in Hyderabad, India
Telugu films remade in other languages
2006 action drama films